Loughmoe West is a civil parish in County Tipperary, Ireland. It is one of 21 civil parishes in the barony of Eliogarty. The River Suir to the east forms the boundary with the parish of Loughmoe East. The village of Loughmore is situated in the townland of Tinvoher.

See also
 Loughmoe East

References

 Loughmoe West